Eremophila buirchellii is a flowering plant in the figwort family, Scrophulariaceae and is endemic to the Mount Augustus National Park in Western Australia. It is an erect shrub with densely clustered leaves, pink, bell-shaped flowers and with most parts of the plant covered with greyish, branched hairs.

Description
The branches are densely covered with greyish branched hairs.

The inside and outside of the petal tube is pink to pinkish white and lacks spots. The petal tube is usually mostly glabrous except for a few glandular hairs. The 4 stamens are about the same length as the petal tube and are well-spaced. Flowering time is from June to August.

Taxonomy and naming
Eremophila buirchellii was first formally described by Andrew Phillip Brown in 2016 and the description was published in Nuytsia. The specific epithet (buirchellii) honours Bevan Buirchell, the collector of  the type specimen and an authority on the genus Eremophila.

Distribution and habitat
This eremophila is only known from Mount Augustus National Park in the Gascoyne biogeographic region where it grows on steep, rocky slopes.

Conservation status
Only about 50 mature plants of this species have been recorded and Eremophila buirchellii (as Eremophila sp. Mt Augustus) has been classified as "Priority Two" by the Western Australian Government Department of Parks and Wildlife meaning that it is poorly known and from only one or a few locations.

References

buirchellii
Eudicots of Western Australia
Plants described in 2016